Konstantin Vladimirovich Pushkaryov (born February 12, 1985) is a Kazakh professional ice hockey winger who is currently playing with HK Kurbads of the Latvian Hockey League (LAT). In May 2022, he became a Parimatch expert.

Playing career
Pushkaryov was drafted in the second round of the 2003 NHL Entry Draft by the Los Angeles Kings, but was traded to the Dallas Stars late in the 2006–07 NHL season in the deal involving former Kings captain Mattias Norström. He played one game for the Kings in the 2005–06 NHL season and earned an assist; he split the 2006–07 NHL season with the Manchester Monarchs of the American Hockey League and the Kings. Pushkaryov scored his first NHL goal on January 8, 2007, against the Edmonton Oilers.

Pushkaryov later signed with Metallurg Magnitogorsk of the KHL, before returning to the AHL's Wilkes-Barre/Scranton Penguins for the 2009–10 season. Prior to the start of the 2010–11 season, Pushkaryov joined Barys Astana of the KHL.

Pushkaryov played 8 seasons with Barys Astana before leaving as a free agent in signing a one-year contract with HK Kurbads of the Latvian Hockey League on December 20, 2018.

International
Pushkaryov was named to the Kazakhstan men's national ice hockey team for competition at the 2014 IIHF World Championship.

Career statistics

Regular season and playoffs

International

References

External links

1985 births
Living people
Avangard Omsk players
Barys Nur-Sultan players
Calgary Hitmen players
HC CSKA Moscow players
Expatriate ice hockey players in Russia
Metallurg Magnitogorsk players
Iowa Stars players
Kazakhstani ice hockey right wingers
Kazakhstani people of Russian descent
Kazzinc-Torpedo players
Los Angeles Kings draft picks
Los Angeles Kings players
Manchester Monarchs (AHL) players
Nomad Astana players
Sportspeople from Oskemen
Wilkes-Barre/Scranton Penguins players
Kazakhstani expatriate sportspeople in the United States
Kazakhstani expatriate sportspeople in Canada
Kazakhstani expatriate ice hockey people
Kazakhstani expatriate sportspeople in Russia
Kazakhstani expatriate sportspeople in Latvia
Expatriate ice hockey players in the United States
Expatriate ice hockey players in Canada
Expatriate ice hockey players in Latvia